Juanita Banana is a Philippine comedy soap opera created by Pablo S. Gomez. It stars Binibining Pilipinas 2009-Universe, Bianca Manalo in the title role. It aired on ABS-CBN from October 25, 2010, to February 18, 2011, replacing Rosalka and was replaced by Precious Hearts Romances Presents: Mana Po.

Overview

1968 film
Juanita Banana had a movie adaptation in 1968, starring Amparo Muñoz as Juanita, Pepito Rodriguez, the late Ricky Belmonte, German Moreno and Bella Flores which was produced by Pablo S. Gomez.

A young woman tries to catch a teardrop from a banana tree's heart believing that it gives her magical powers but she gets the fascination of a dwarf prince who uses his own magic to grant her every wish.

Cast and characters

Villa Family
Bianca Manalo as Juanita Villa  
Lito Pimentel as Val Villa 
Trina Legaspi as Daldit Villa
Aaron Junatas as Bubwit Villa
Isay Alvarez as Belen Villa

Buenaventura Family
Rodjun Cruz as Joaquin Buenaventura 
Dulce as Donya Digna Buenaventura
Lauren Young as Sunny Rose Buenaventura
Liza Lorena as Donya Cristina
Roy Alvarez as Don Arnulfo Buenaventura

The Dwarfs
Matt Evans as Prinsipe Rikitik
Carlos Morales as Haring Bradpitik
Kalila Aguilos as Reyna Sirikit
Joma Labayen as Ngititik
David Chua as Walastik
Lui Villaruz as Pepetik

Supporting cast
Bern Josep "Bekimon" Persia as Mario Dimaguiba
Rey "PJ" Abellana as Boy Dimaguiba
Katya Santos as Margaux Mamaril 
Bayani Casimiro Jr. as Benjo
Martin del Rosario as Chester
Raye Bacquirin as Thelma

Special participation
Miles Ocampo as Young Juanita Villa
CJ Navato as Young Joaquin Buenaventura
Yong An Chiu as Young Mario
Bea Basa as Young Daldit Villa

See also
List of programs broadcast by ABS-CBN
List of ABS-CBN drama series

References

Philippine comedy television series
ABS-CBN drama series
2010 Philippine television series debuts
2011 Philippine television series endings
Live action television shows based on films
Television shows based on comics
Filipino-language television shows
Television shows set in the Philippines